Alexander Lévy (born 1 August 1990) is a French professional golfer who currently plays on the European Tour.

Lévy won the French Amateur Championship in 2009, and the French International Amateur Championship the next year.  Turning pro in 2011, his first wins of the European Tour came in 2014 at the Volvo China Open and the Portugal Masters. He won a title each year between 2016 and 2018 : the 2016 Porsche European Open, the 2017 Volvo China Open and the Trophee Hassan II in 2018. He rose to 47th in the world following this last victory. At a nationwide level, only fellow countryman Thomas Levet is in possession of more titles on the European Tour (6), Levy currently trails Levet by one.

Personal life
Levy was born to French parents on 1 August 1990 in Orange, California, and is Jewish. His father (Philippe) and mother are pharmacists.

When he was four years old, his family moved to Bandol, France, where he resides. At 14 years of age, he joined the French Federation of Golf's academy for secondary school. His nickname is El Toro.

Amateur career
Lévy had a successful amateur career before turning professional, winning the French Amateur Championship in 2009 and the French International Amateur Championship the next year, when he was also a member of the winning French team at the Eisenhower Trophy World Team Championship.

Professional career
Turning pro in 2011, Lévy initially played on the Challenge Tour as an invited player in 2011 and 2012 before earning his European Tour playing rights at qualifying school for the 2013 season.

His first win of the European Tour came at the Volvo China Open in 2014, an event co-sanctioned with the OneAsia Tour, where he shot a 19-under-par 269. During the second round, Lévy shot a course record 62 at Genzon Golf Club giving him a four-stroke lead at the halfway point from which he was able to hold on to win. Following this win Levy was named as April 2014 European Tour Golfer of the Month

His first appearance in a major championship was at the 2014 PGA Championship. In October 2014, he claimed his second European Tour win at the Portugal Masters in an event which was shortened to 36 holes due to adverse weather conditions. With his win, he became the first French golfer to win more than once in the same season.

In winning the 2016 Porsche European Open at Bad Griesbach, Germany, at the age of 26 years and 55 days, he became the youngest Frenchman in history to win three European Tour titles.

He again won the Volvo China Open in 2017, becoming the first two-time winner of the event in its 23-year history.

Amateur wins
2009 French Amateur Championship
2010 French International Amateur Championship

Professional wins (5)

European Tour wins (5)

*Note: Tournament shortened to 36/54 holes due to weather.
1Co-sanctioned by the OneAsia Tour

European Tour playoff record (2–2)

Results in major championships

 

CUT = missed the half-way cut
"T" indicates a tie for a place

Results in World Golf Championships
Results not in chronological order before 2015.

QF, R16, R32, R64 = Round in which player lost in match play
"T" = tied

Team appearances
Amateur
European Boys' Team Championship (representing France): 2008
European Amateur Team Championship (representing France): 2009, 2010, 2011
Eisenhower Trophy (representing France): 2010 (winners)

Professional
EurAsia Cup (representing Europe): 2018 (winners)
World Cup (representing France): 2018

See also
2012 European Tour Qualifying School graduates
List of Jewish golfers

References

External links

French male golfers
European Tour golfers
Jewish golfers
Golfers from California
Jewish American sportspeople
21st-century French Jews
American people of French-Jewish descent
People from Orange, California
1990 births
Living people
21st-century American Jews